Tronsanges is a commune in the Nièvre department in central France. Tronsanges station has rail connections to Nevers and Cosne-sur-Loire.

Demographics
On 1 January 2017, the estimated population was 395.

See also
Communes of the Nièvre department

References

Communes of Nièvre